Off to the Races was an Australian television game show which aired from 1967 to 1969. Produced by LKN Productions and hosted by Bert Bryant, and aired on ATV-0 (now ATV-10 and part of Network Ten). Despite its short run, it was a popular show.

Episode status
Five episodes are held by National Film and Sound Archive. Given the wiping of that era and generally low survival rate of ATV series of the 1960s, it is unlikely any other episodes still exist.

References

External links

1967 Australian television series debuts
1969 Australian television series endings
Black-and-white Australian television shows
English-language television shows
1960s Australian game shows